Duke Ferrante's End (German:Herzog Ferrantes Ende) is a 1922 German silent historical film directed by Paul Wegener and Rochus Gliese and starring Paul Wegener, Hans Stürm and Hugo Döblin. It was shot at the EFA Studios in Berlin. The art direction was by Walter Reimann. It premiered at the Marmorhaus in Berlin.

Cast
 Paul Wegener as Herzog Ferrante  
 Hans Stürm as Matteo  
 Hugo Döblin as Trivulzio  
 Ferdinand Gregori as Guido Colonna  
 Lyda Salmonova as Beatrice  
 Ernst Deutsch as Orlando  
 Adele Sandrock as Dienerin  
 Walter Janssen as Antonio  
 Wilhelm Diegelmann as Rüstmeister  
 Werner Krauskopf as Hauptmann der Leibwache  
 Alice Petzinna as Page  
 Gustav Roos as Balsamierer  
 Fritz Richard as Gremio  
 Hellmuth Bergmann as Edelmann  
 Albrecht Viktor Blum as  
 Hertha von Walther
 Gerhard Bienert

References

Bibliography
 Waldman, Harry. Missing Reels: Lost Films of American and European Cinema. McFarland, 2000.

External links

1922 films
Films of the Weimar Republic
Films directed by Paul Wegener
German silent feature films
Films set in the 15th century
Films set in Italy
German black-and-white films
1920s historical films
German historical films
Films shot at Halensee Studios
1920s German films